Adhara, Bangladesh is a village in Chandpur District in the Chittagong Division of eastern Bangladesh.

See also

References

Villages in Chandpur District
Villages in Chittagong Division